Puerto Rico Highway 141 (PR-141) is a road that travels from Jayuya, Puerto Rico to northeastern Utuado. This highway begins at PR-144 in downtown Jayuya and ends at PR-140 in Mameyes Abajo.

Major intersections

Related route

Puerto Rico Highway 5141 (PR-5141) is a bypass road that branches off from PR-141 northeast of downtown Jayuya and ends at PR-144 west of the municipal center.

See also

 List of highways numbered 141

References

External links

 PR-141, Municipio de Jayuya, Puerto Rico

141